The Battle of Skra-di-Legen (Skora di Legen) was a two-day battle which took place at the Skra fortified position, located northeast of Mount Paiko, which is north-west of Thessaloniki, on May 29–30, 1918, on the Macedonian front of World War I. The battle was the first large-scale employment on the front of Greek troops of the National Defense Army Corps (Greece, united after the National Schism, had joined the war in summer 1917), and resulted in the elimination of a whole enemy regiment and in the capture of the heavily fortified Bulgarian positions.

The Allied force comprised three Greek divisions of the National Defense Army Corps under Lieutenant General Emmanouil Zymvrakakis, plus one French brigade. The three Greek divisions comprised 
the Archipelago Division under Major General Dimitrios Ioannou, 
the Crete Division under Major General Panagiotis Spiliadis, 
the Serres Division under Lieutenant Colonel Epameinondas Zymvrakakis. 
The 5th and 6th Regiments from the Archipelago Division were in the center, the 7th and 8th Regiments from the Crete Division were on the right flank and the 1st Regiment of the Serres Division was on the left flank.

Battle

The Bulgarians occupied a strong position on a massif, presenting an awkward salient for the Allies. In the early morning of 29 May 1918, Greek and French artillery, together with two British 8-inch guns, fired on Bulgarian positions in preparation for the next morning's assault. British heavy batteries on the left bank of the Vardar contributed to the bombardment.
At dawn on 30 May 1918, Greek troops, in "a brilliant bayonet charge under withering fire", rushed the enemy trenches, the 1st (Serres) and 5th and 6th (Archipelago) Regiment capturing the heights of Skra at 6.30 from the outnumbered Bulgarians, while the 7th (Cretan) seized the heights between the two branches of the Liumnitsa River. On a 12 km. front, to a depth of 2 km., a complex maze of fortifications and trenches was captured. Starting from the evening of the same day until May 31, the Bulgarian army launched several counterattacks on positions held by the Crete Division. All attacks were repelled, cementing the Allied victory. The Greek troops were then sent into the second lines to recuperate, and were relieved by French troops. 

In the battle, 441 Allied soldiers were killed, 2,227 wounded and 164 missing in action.

Bulgaria suffered 600 soldiers killed and 2,045 taken prisoner. 200 German military personnel were among the captured. 12 artillery pieces and 32 machine guns as well as other equipment were also captured.

Importance and aftermath

The battle was important for the progress it marked on the Macedonian front, as the Allies after a year of unsuccessful attacks had finally broken the Bulgarian positions. The failure of a fresh Bulgarian counter-attack to materialize in the days following the battle was one of the first significant signs of the enemy's depressed morale. Field-Marshal Hindenburg later revealed in his memoirs that the troops detailed for a counter-attack had refused to march. The Battle of Skra was the last engagement on the Macedonian front before the final offensive of September 1918. 

The operation's objectives, however, were "almost more political than military". Success, it was reckoned, would be a boost for the pro-Allied Venizelist party in Greece and for Greece's confidence in its Army, at a time when German-trained and equipped Bulgarians in defensive positions were considered in Athens likely to be stronger than Greeks trained by the French for attack. The Greek Army, in spite of its successes in the Balkan Wars of 1912-13, was before Skra thought by some Western strategists to be of poor quality, a view dating from its defeat in the Greco-Turkish War of 1897. This view, however, was not shared by General Guillaumat, commander of the Allied Army of the Orient in Salonika, who had a good opinion of the Greek troops and attached considerable importance to them. To the Venizelist National Army of Zymvrakakis he was able to add, mainly through diplomatic handling of King Alexander, 20,000 former royalist troops. The manner of the Greek army's victory at Skra boosted its confidence and won it the esteem of the Allies, drawing a telegram to Greek Prime Minister Eleftherios Venizelos from Guillaumat telling him "This victory will fill all Greece with legitimate pride". Major-General Ioannou, commanding the 5th and 6th Archipelago in the action, distinguished himself for his personal courage. After years of doubt, belief in an eventual Allied victory in the War took hold in Greece after Skra. 

Skra led to Guillaumat being recalled to France by Clemenceau, to be at hand to take over on the Western Front should Foch or Pétain fail. The Greek success at Skra later helped Venizelos persuade the new Allied commander in Salonika, General Franchet d'Espèrey, to modify his plans so that the Greek army be allowed a greater role in the coming push. In consequence, in the final offensive in September 1918, which breached the German coalition's defences, there were Greek divisions at five points in the broad Allied line of attack. The importance of the May battle, despite its comparatively small numbers, was appreciated by the Allies after the War. In the victory march in Paris in 1919, along with the names of Marne, Somme, Verdun, and many others, appeared the name of Skra-di-Legen.

The nearest village to the battlefield was called Liumnitsa at the time. 'Skra-di-Legen' appeared on the Austrian wartime 1:200,000 staff map, and gave its name to the battle. The village, northwest of Axioupoli and near the Greek border with North Macedonia,  was later renamed just Skra.

References

Bibliography

 Charles F. Horne, Source records of the Great war, volume VI, National Alumni 1923
 Grigorios Dafnis, Sofoklis Eleftheriou Venizelos, Ikaros, Athens 1970, pages 44–47

External links

 The British Campaign in Salonika - list of British units involved, as well as an overview of the campaign
 Μάχη του Σκρα (17/30 Μαΐου 1918) [Battle of Skra (17/30 May 1918)] , Hellenic Army, First World War, 100th Anniversary portal  

Skra-di-Legen
Skra-di-Legen
Skra-di-Legen
Skra-di-Legen
Skra-di-Legen
Skra-di-Legen
1918 in Greece
Macedonian front
May 1918 events